The Primetime Emmy Award for Outstanding Lead Actor in a Limited or Anthology Series or Movie is an award presented annually by the Academy of Television Arts & Sciences (ATAS). It is given in honor of an actor who has delivered an outstanding performance in a leading role on a television limited series or television movie for the primetime network season. 

The award was first presented at the 7th Primetime Emmy Awards on March 7, 1955, to Robert Cummings, for his performance as Juror #8 on the Studio One episode "Twelve Angry Men". It has undergone several name changes, with the category split into two categories at the 25th Primetime Emmy Awards: Outstanding Lead Actor in a Special Program – Drama or Comedy; and Outstanding Lead Actor in a Limited Series. By the 31st Primetime Emmy Awards, the categories were merged into one, and it has since undergone several name changes, leading to its current title.

Since its inception, the award has been given to 58 actors. Michael Keaton is the current recipient of the award, for his portrayal of Dr. Samuel Finnix on Dopesick. Laurence Olivier has won the most awards in this category, with four, while Hal Holbrook has received the most nominations for the award, on seven occasions.

Winners and nominations

1950s

1960s

1970s

1980s

1990s

2000s

2010s

2020s

Programs with multiple wins

2 wins
 American Crime Story

Performers with multiple wins

4 wins
 Laurence Olivier

3 wins
 Peter Ustinov

2 wins
 Fred Astaire
 Hume Cronyn
 Peter Falk
 Hal Holbrook
 Anthony Hopkins
 Al Pacino
 James Woods

Programs with multiple nominations

13 nominations
 Hallmark Hall of Fame

7 nominations
 Playhouse 90

4 nominations
 Luther
 Sherlock

3 nominations
 American Crime Story
 CBS Playhouse
 The Dick Powell Theatre
 Fargo
 Studio One

2 nominations
 An Early Frost
 Behind the Candelabra
 Bob Hope Presents the Chrysler Theatre
 Brian's Song
 Brideshead Revisited
 Columbo
 The Defenders
 Ford Star Jubilee
 Genius
 Hamilton
 Hatfields & McCoys
 Holocaust
 The Kennedys
 Lonesome Dove
 Masada
 McCloud
 The Night Of
 Producers' Showcase
 Promise
 Recount
 Rich Man, Poor Man
 Shōgun
 Something the Lord Made
 The Special Relationship
 The United States Steel Hour

Performers with multiple nominations

7 nominations
 Hal Holbrook

6 nominations
 Benedict Cumberbatch
 Laurence Olivier

5 nominations
 Beau Bridges
 James Garner
 Jack Lemmon
 Jason Robards
 Mickey Rooney
 George C. Scott
 James Woods

4 nominations
 Kenneth Branagh
 Richard Chamberlain
 Hume Cronyn
 Robert Duvall
 Idris Elba
 William H. Macy

3 nominations
 Lee J. Cobb
 Laurence Fishburne
 Peter Falk
 Henry Fonda
 Louis Gossett, Jr.
 Anthony Hopkins
 Ben Kingsley
 Fredric March
 Al Pacino
 Christopher Plummer
 Peter Strauss
 Peter Ustinov

2 nominations
 Alan Alda
 Alan Arkin
 Fred Astaire
 Antonio Banderas
 Robert Blake
 Michael Caine
 Brian Dennehy
 William Devane
 Melvyn Douglas
 Albert Finney
 Ricky Gervais
 John Gielgud
 Hugh Grant
 Alec Guinness
 Edward Herrmann
 Trevor Howard

 Jeremy Irons
 Tommy Lee Jones
 John Lithgow
 Ewan McGregor
 Ian McKellen
 Barry Pepper
 Sidney Poitier
 Alan Rickman
 Cliff Robertson
 Mark Ruffalo
 Geoffrey Rush
 Martin Sheen
 Gary Sinise
 Rod Steiger
 Dennis Weaver
 Tom Wilkinson
 Ed Wynn

See also
 TCA Award for Individual Achievement in Drama
 Golden Globe Award for Best Actor – Miniseries or Television Film
 Critics' Choice Television Award for Best Actor in a Movie/Miniseries
 Screen Actors Guild Award for Outstanding Performance by a Male Actor in a Miniseries or Television Movie

References

Lead Actor - Miniseries or Movie
 
Emmy Award